There have been three baronetcies created for persons with the surname Booth, one in the Baronetage of England and two in the Baronetage of the United Kingdom. The 1916 creation remains extant, the 1835 creation became extinct in 1896 and the 1611 baronetcy has been dormant since 1797. The senior line of the first creation was elevated to the peerage as Baron Delamer and Earl of Warrington.

History
The Booth Baronetcy, of Dunham Massey in the County of Chester, was created in the Baronetage of England on 22 May 1611 for Sir George Booth, High Sheriff of both Lancashire and Cheshire. The Booths were amongst the first eighteen families raised to the baronetage when the Order of Baronets was first instituted by James I in 1611. Booth was succeeded by his grandson, also George, who succeeded him as second Baronet and in 1661 he was raised to the Peerage of England as Baron Delamer, of Dunham Massey in the County of Chester. On his death the title passed to his eldest surviving son, Henry, the second Baron; he served as Chancellor of the Exchequer between 1689 and 1690 and on 17 April 1690 he was created Earl of Warrington in the Peerage of England. The earldom became extinct on the death of his son, the second Earl, in 1758. The baronetcy and barony devolved to the late Earl's first cousin, the fourth Baron. He was the son of Dr Robert Booth, Dean of Bristol, younger son of the first Baron. On his death in 1770 the barony became extinct. However, he was succeeded in the baronetcy by his second cousin, the sixth Baronet: the Reverend Sir George Booth. He was the grandson of Nathaniel Booth, younger brother of the first Baron. The baronetcy became dormant on his death in 1797.

Langham Booth, younger son of the first Earl of Warrington, sat as Member of Parliament for Cheshire. Lady Mary Booth, only child of the second Earl, married Harry Grey, 4th Earl of Stamford. In 1796 the titles of Baron Delamer and Earl of Warrington were revived in favour of their son, George Grey, 5th Earl of Stamford.

The Booth Baronetcy, of Portland Place in the County of London, was created in the Baronetage of the United Kingdom on 27 March 1835 for the wealthy gin distiller Sir Felix Booth. This title became extinct on the death of the third Baronet in 1896.

The Booth Baronetcy, of Allerton Beeches in the City of Liverpool, was created in the Baronetage of the United Kingdom on 24 January 1916 for Sir Alfred Allen Booth, a Director of Alfred Booth and Company and Chairman of the Cunard Steamship Company. As of 2018 the title is held by his grandson, Sir Douglas Booth, 3rd Baronet, who succeeded his father in 1960. He is a television and film writer living in the United States with his wife and two daughters.

Titleholders

Booth baronets, of Dunham Massey (1611)

Sir George Booth, 1st Baronet (1566–1652)
Sir George Booth, 2nd Baronet (1622–1684) (created Baron Delamer in 1661)

Barons Delamer (1661)
George Booth, 1st Baron Delamer (1622–1684)
Henry Booth, 2nd Baron Delamer (1652–1694) (created Earl of Warrington in 1690)

Earls of Warrington (1690)
Henry Booth, 1st Earl of Warrington (& 3rd Baronet) (1652–1694)
George Booth, 2nd Earl of Warrington (& 4th Baronet) (1675–1758)

Barons Delamer (1661)
Nathaniel Booth, 4th Baron Delamer (& 5th Baronet) (1709–1770)

Booth baronets, of Dunham Massey (1611; dormant)
Rev. Sir George Booth, 6th Baronet (1724–1797)

Booth baronets, of Portland Place (1835)
Sir Felix Booth, 1st Baronet (1775–1850)
Sir Williamson Booth, 2nd Baronet (1810–1877)
Sir Charles Booth, 3rd Baronet (1812–1896)

Booth baronets, of Allerton Beeches (1916)
Sir Alfred Allen Booth, 1st Baronet (1872–1948)
Sir Philip Booth, 2nd Baronet (1907–1960)
Sir Douglas Allen Booth, 3rd Baronet (born 1949)

The heir presumptive is the present holder's brother Dr Derek Blake Booth (born 1953); the heir in line is his son, Colin Booth (born 1982).

See also
Earl of Warrington
Earl of Stamford
Dunham Massey
Baron Gore-Booth
Charles Booth

References

Further reading
www.burkespeerage.com
Debrett's Peerage & Baronetage, 2015
Cracroft's Peerage

 

Booth family of Dunham Massey
Baronetcies in the Baronetage of England
Baronetcies in the Baronetage of the United Kingdom
Extinct baronetcies in the Baronetage of the United Kingdom
Baronetcies created with special remainders
Dormant baronetcies
Noble families of the United Kingdom